Protein disulfide-isomerase, also known as the beta-subunit of prolyl 4-hydroxylase (P4HB), is an enzyme that in humans encoded by the P4HB gene. The human P4HB gene is localized in chromosome 17q25. Unlike other prolyl 4-hydroxylase family proteins, this protein is multifunctional and acts as an oxidoreductase for disulfide formation, breakage, and isomerization. The activity of P4HB is tightly regulated. Both dimer dissociation and substrate binding are likely to enhance its enzymatic activity during the catalysis process.

Structure 
P4HB has four thioredoxin domains (a, b, b’, and a’), with two CGHC active sites in the a and a’ domains. In both the reduced and oxidized state, these domains are arranged as a horseshoe shape. In reduced P4HB, domains a, b, and b' are in the same plane, while domain a' twists out at a ∼45° angle. When oxidized, the four domains stay in the same plane, and the distance between the active sites is larger than that in the reduced state. The oxidized form also exposes more hydrophobic areas and possesses a larger cleft to facilitate substrate binding. P4HB has been shown to dimerize in vivo via noncatalytic bb' domains. Formation of dimer blocks substrate-binding site and inhibits P4HB’s activity.

Function 

This gene encodes the beta subunit of prolyl 4-hydroxylase, a highly abundant multifunctional enzyme that belongs to the protein disulfide isomerase family. When present as a tetramer consisting of two alpha and two beta subunits, this enzyme is involved in hydroxylation of prolyl residues in preprocollagen. This enzyme is also a disulfide isomerase containing two thioredoxin domains that catalyze the formation, breakage and rearrangement of disulfide bonds. Other known functions include its ability to act as a chaperone that inhibits aggregation of misfolded proteins in a concentration-dependent manner, its ability to bind thyroid hormone, its role in both the influx and efflux of S-nitrosothiol-bound nitric oxide, and its function as a subunit of the microsomal triglyceride transfer protein complex.

Clinical significance 
P4HB is a risk factor of amyotrophic lateral sclerosis (ALS). Studies have shown significant genotypic associations for two SNPs in P4HB with FALS (familial ALS), rs876016 (P=0.0198) and rs2070872 (P=0.0046). Together with other ER stress markers, P4HB is greatly elevated in ALS spinal cord. P4HB can also be nitrosylated, and elevation of nitrosylated P4HB has been shown in Parkinson's and Alzheimer's disease brain tissue, as well as in transgenic mutant superoxide dismutase 1 mouse and human sporadic amyotrophic lateral sclerosis spinal cord tissues. In addition to neurodegenerative diseases, P4HB level is upregulated in glioblastoma multiforme (GBM) (brain tumor). Inhibition of P4HB attenuates resistance to temozolomide, a standard GBM chemotherapeutic agent, via the PERK arm of endoplasmic reticulum stress response pathway. Furthermore, heterozygous missense mutation in P4HB can cause Cole-Carpenter syndrome, a severe bone fragility disorder.

Interactions 

P4HB has been shown to interact with UBQLN1, ERO1LB and ERO1L.

References

Further reading 

 
 
 
 
 
 
 
 
 
 
 
 
 
 
 
 
 
 
 
 

Endoplasmic reticulum resident proteins